Vandopsis, abbreviated as Vdps in horticultural trade, is a genus of orchids in the family Orchidaceae. It contains ca. 5 species found in Southeast Asia, Southern China, the Philippines, and New Guinea. Recently Vandopsis undulata was excluded, as the genus would otherwise be paraphyletic. The species was transferred to the genus Cymbilabia.

References 

 Vandopsis in Flora of China: http://www.efloras.org/florataxon.aspx?flora_id=2&taxon_id=134365

External links 

 
Vandeae genera